The expression Ancient Europe may be used in a variety of senses:

The ancient concept of Europa in Greek geography, in origin "the landmass adjacent to Thrace"
Europa (ancient geography)
Europa (Roman province), in the Diocese of Thrace
The territory of Europe (the continent according to its modern definition) in "ancient times":
Prehistoric Europe, human presence in Europe before recorded history
Neolithic Europe, 7000 BCE to 1700 BCE
Bronze Age Europe
Iron Age Europe
Roman imperial period (chronology)
Roman Iron Age
The territories of Europe participating in Classical antiquity
Ancient Greece
Ancient Rome
Hellenistic period, emergence of the Roman Empire
Roman Empire, the post-Roman Republic period
Late antiquity, from classical antiquity to the Middle Ages

See also
Old Europe (disambiguation)
Ancient history#Europe
History of Europe